In physics, natural units are physical units of measurement in which only universal physical constants are used as defining constants, such that each of these constants acts as a coherent unit of a quantity. For example, the elementary charge  may be used as a natural unit of electric charge, and the speed of light  may be used as a natural unit of speed. A purely natural system of units has all of its units defined such that each of these can be expressed as a product of powers of defining physical constants.

Through nondimensionalization, physical quantities may then redefined so that the defining constants can be omitted from mathematical expressions of physical laws, and while this has the apparent advantage of simplicity, it may entail a loss of clarity due to the loss of information for dimensional analysis.

Systems of natural units

Planck units

The Planck unit system uses the following defining constants:

Planck units form a system of natural units that is not defined in terms of properties of any prototype, physical object, or even elementary particle. This makes Planck units particularly convenient and common in theories of quantum gravity, including string theory.

The Planck system of units is now understood to use the reduced Planck constant, in place of the Planck constant, .

Stoney units

The Stoney unit system uses the following defining constants:

George Johnstone Stoney's unit system preceded that of Planck. He presented the idea in a lecture entitled "On the Physical Units of Nature" delivered to the British Association in 1874. Stoney units did not consider the Planck constant, which was discovered only after Stoney's proposal.

Stoney units are rarely used in modern physics for calculations, but they are of historical interest.

Atomic units

The Hartree atomic unit system uses the following defining constants:

The Coulomb constant, is generally expressed as  when working with this system.

These units are designed to simplify atomic and molecular physics and chemistry, especially the hydrogen atom, and are widely used in these fields. The Hartree units were first proposed by Douglas Hartree.

The units are designed especially to characterize the behavior of an electron in the ground state of a hydrogen atom. For example, in Hartree atomic units, in the Bohr model of the hydrogen atom an electron in the ground state has orbital radius (the Bohr radius) 0 = 1 , orbital velocity = 1 ⋅, angular momentum = 1 ⋅⋅, ionization energy =  ⋅⋅, etc.

The unit of energy is called the Hartree energy in the Hartree system. The speed of light is relatively large in Hartree atomic units ( =  ⋅ ≈ 137 ⋅) since an electron in hydrogen tends to move much more slowly than the speed of light. The gravitational constant is extremely small in atomic units ( ≈ 10−45 ⋅⋅), which is due to the gravitational force between two electrons being far weaker than the Coulomb force between them.

 =  = ,
 = ,
 = 2,
 = .

Natural units (particle and atomic physics)

This natural unit system, used only in the fields of particle and atomic physics, uses the following defining constants:
where  is the speed of light, e is the electron mass,  is the reduced Planck constant, and 0 is the vacuum permittivity.

The vacuum permittivity 0 is implicitly used as a nondimensionalization constant, as is evident from the physicists' expression for the fine-structure constant, written , which may be compared to the same expression in SI: .

Quantum chromodynamics units

Defining constants:

Here,  is the proton rest mass. Strong units, also called quantum chromodynamics (QCD) units, are "convenient for work in QCD and nuclear physics, where quantum mechanics and relativity are omnipresent and the proton is an object of central interest".

Schrödinger units 

In this system of units the speed of light changes in inverse proportion to the fine structure constant, therefore it has gained some interest recent years in the niche hypothesis of time-variation of fundamental constants.

Geometrized units

Defining constants:
, .

The geometrized unit system, used in general relativity, is an incompletely defined system. In this system, the base physical units are chosen so that the speed of light and the gravitational constant are coherent units and often used for nondimensionalization. Other units may be treated however desired. Planck units and Stoney units are examples of geometrized unit systems.

Summary table

where:
 is the fine-structure constant ( ≈ 0.007297)
 ≈ 
 ≈ 
A dash (–) indicates where the system is not sufficient to express the quantity.

See also

 Anthropic units
 Dimensional analysis
 Dimensionless physical constant
 SI units
 N-body units
 Physical constant
 Astronomical system of units
 Planck units
 Units of measurement

Notes and references

External links

The NIST website (National Institute of Standards and Technology) is a convenient source of data on the commonly recognized constants.
K.A. Tomilin: NATURAL SYSTEMS OF UNITS; To the Centenary Anniversary of the Planck System  A comparative overview/tutorial of various systems of natural units having historical use.
Pedagogic Aides to Quantum Field Theory Click on the link for Chap. 2 to find an extensive, simplified introduction to natural units.
Natural System Of Units In General Relativity (PDF), by Alan L. Myers (University of Pennsylvania). Equations for conversions from natural to SI units.

 
Metrology

bs:Prirodne jedinice
sr:Природне јединице
sh:Prirodne jedinice